Communist Youth of Ivory Coast (Jeunesse Communiste de Côte d'Ivoire) is a political youth movement in Ivory Coast. JCOCI is the youth wing of the Revolutionary Communist Party of Côte d'Ivoire.

On 24 June 2004, the General Secretary of JCOCI, Habib Dodo, was murdered by Student Federation of Ivory Coast activists.

References

External links
 Political Poster Commemorating the Murder of Abib Dodo
   Translation of PCRCI Statement on Abib Dodo
Me Traoré Drissa Mouvement Ivoirien des Droits de l’Homme (MIDH): “Le campus est devenu un no man’s land” Nord-Sud - Mardi 5 Juillet 2005 .
Halte à la répression et aux assassinats en Côte d'Ivoire Solidarité avec les militants du Parti Communiste Révolutionnaire de Côte d'Ivoire et de son organisation de jeunesse Parti Communiste des Ouvriers de France
Secours Rouge / APAPC Octobre-novembre 2004 - n° 7
  Rapport de la Commission d’enquête internationale sur les allégations de violations des droits de l’homme en Côte d’Ivoire (May 2004) on Fr. Wikisource.

Communism in Ivory Coast
Youth wings of communist parties
Youth wings of political parties in Ivory Coast